The name Asian shore crab may refer to either of two species of crab:
Hemigrapsus sanguineus
Hemigrapsus takanoi

Animal common name disambiguation pages